Sonapur is a village in the Alipurduar I CD block in the Alipurduar subdivision of the Alipurduar district  in the state of West Bengal, India.

Geography

Location

Area overview
Alipurduar district is covered by two maps. It is an extensive area in the eastern end of the Dooars in West Bengal. It is undulating country, largely forested, with numerous rivers flowing down from the outer ranges of the Himalayas in Bhutan. It is a predominantly rural area with 79.38% of the population living in the rural areas. The district has 1 municipal town and 20 census towns and that means that 20.62% of the population lives in urban areas. The scheduled castes and scheduled tribes, taken together, form more than half the population in all the six community development blocks in the district. There is a high concentration of tribal people (scheduled tribes) in the three northern blocks of the district.

Note: The map alongside presents some of the notable locations in the subdivision. All places marked in the map are linked in the larger full screen map.

Demographics
As per the 2011 Census of India, Uttar Sonapur had a total population of 5,632.  There were 2,938 (52%) males and 2,694 (48%) females. There were 646 persons in the age range of 0 to 6 years. The total number of literate people in Uttar Sonapur was 3,822 (76.65% of the population over 6 years).

Education
Pijushkanti Mukherjee Mahavidyalaya was established at Sonapur in 2015. Affiliated with the University of North Bengal, it offers courses in arts.

Healthcare
Pachkalguri Rural Hospital, with 30 beds, at Pachkalguri, is the major government medical facility in the Alipurduar I CD block.

References

Villages in Alipurduar district